Kjerulf Glacier is a glacier in Jan Mayen. It begins at the Hakluyttoppen slope, in the outer crater edge of the Beerenberg.

The glacier was named after Norwegian geologist Theodor Kjerulf (1825–88), founder of the Geological Survey of Norway, during the Norwegian North-Atlantic Expedition 1876-1878 led by Henrik Mohn.

See also
List of glaciers in Norway
Svalbard and Jan Mayen

References

External links
 Glaciers of Jan Mayen

Glaciers of Jan Mayen